The Human Ecology Fund was a CIA-funded operation through the Cornell University College of Human Ecology Society for the Investigation of Human Ecology to support covert research on brainwashing. It was also connected to research in the area of anthropology.

MK-Ultra connection
Louis Jolyon West was among many who received funds from the CIA through the fund. He did his psychiatry residency at Cornell University, an MKUltra institution and site of the Human Ecology Fund. He was later contracted by the CIA and the proposal submitted by West was titled "Psychophysiological Studies of Hypnosis and Suggestibility" with an accompanying document titled "Studies of Dissociative States".

See also
 Hope Commission (established to investigate Australia's intelligence agencies)
 Church Commission
 Human rights violations by the CIA
 Pike Committee
 Rockefeller Commission
 The Shadow Factory
 Surveillance abuse
 Unethical human experimentation in the United States

References

Central Intelligence Agency operations